Norfolk Roadside Nature Reserve is a scheme which was set up in the mid-1990s by collaboration between the Norfolk County Council and the Norfolk Wildlife Trust. The aim of this scheme is to protect and promote the verges of Norfolk's roadside, that contain rare and scarce plant and insect species. Many of Norfolk's roadside verges have survived modern road improvements and as such are remnants of the natural grassland habitats that were once common and widespread in the British Isles. There are currently 67 (October 2007) such sites around the Norfolk countryside, but more are added each year. Once each year every Roadside Nature Reserve is surveyed and recorded by a dedicated group of volunteers from the trust. Demarcation posts are sited at each end of the Reserves.

The verges
Many of the reserves can be found on roads that were laid down centuries ago and their routes have changed very little. In the past, farmers and local people would use the verges to crop hay to feed their animals, who were also grazed on these verges as they were moved around the countryside. These practices produced a rich, bio-diverse grassland, that still exists on these verges.

Plants and wildlife
Some of the more unusual flora that can be found on these reserves are such plants as:

 Purple broomrape (Orobanche purpurea) 
Breckland speedwell (Veronica praecox)
 Crested cow-wheat (Melampyrum cristatum) 
 Sand catchfly (Silene conica) 
 Fragrant agrimony (Agrimonia procera)
 Adderstongue fern (Ophioglossum vulgatum)
 Dyer's greenweed (Genista tinctoria)
 Pepper saxifrage (Silaum silaus) 
 Sulphur clover (Trifolium ochroleucon)
 Pyramidal orchid (Anacamptis pyramidalis)

There are also rare fungi to be found such as Sandy Stilt puffball (Battarrea phalloides).The reserves also are used as conduits for many species and make ideal hunting grounds they are used by such species such as:

Bats, 
Harriers, 
Owls, 
Stoats, 
Weasels,

In the summer months butterflies and moths are attracted to the sites.

Gallery
Rare Plants

Other Species

The Locations

References

External links
 Norfolk Wildlife Trust.
 Norfolk County Council: Roadside Nature Reserves

Nature reserves in Norfolk